Bruce Leonard Buggins (29 January 1935 – 5 December 2018) was an Australian cricketer. He played 63 first-class matches as Western Australia's wicket-keeper between 1954-55 and 1962-63. 

At the age of 17, before he had begun to play first-class cricket, Buggins was regarded as a possible future Test player. On the opening day of his first-class debut in November 1954, he caught four South Australian batsmen and conceded no byes in the first innings of 296. He had replaced John Munro in the selected team after Munro became unavailable. Buggins kept his place in the team for nine seasons.

Buggins represented South Perth in Premier Cricket and still holds the club record for most dismissals for a wicket-keeper, with 199 catches and 97 stumpings. He worked in the brewing industry in Perth.

References

External links
 

1935 births
2018 deaths
Australian cricketers
Western Australia cricketers
Cricketers from Perth, Western Australia